Pigeonroost is an unincorporated community in Mitchell County, North Carolina,  United States.

History
Pigeonroost takes its name from the extinct passenger pigeon which was once abundant throughout the region.

References

Unincorporated communities in Mitchell County, North Carolina
Unincorporated communities in North Carolina